

Seeds
  Tamarine Tanasugarn /  Sanchai Ratiwatana
 Riza Zalameda /  Treat Conrad Huey

Draw

Mixed Doubles